Praseodymium(III) sulfate is a praseodymium compound with formula Pr2(SO4)3. It is an odourless whitish-green crystalline compound. The anhydrous substance readily absorbs water forming pentahydrate and octahydrate.

Properties 
Praseodymium sulfate is stable under standard conditions. At elevated temperatures, it gradually loses water and becomes more whitish. Like all rare earth sulfates, its solubility decreases with temperature, a property once used to separate it from other, non-rare earth compounds.

Pentahydrate and octahydrate have monoclinic crystal structures with densities of 3.713 and 2.813 g/cm3, respectively. The octahydrate crystals are optically biaxial, with refractive index components of nα = 1.5399, nβ = 1.5494 and nγ = 1.5607. They belong to the space group C12/c1 (No. 15) and have lattice constants a = 1370.0(2) pm, b = 686.1(1) pm, c = 1845.3(2) pm, β = 102.80(1)° and Z = 4.

Synthesis 
Crystals of octahydrate can be grown from solution obtained by dissolving wet Pr2O3 powder with sulfuric acid. This procedure can be optimised by adding a few evaporation/dissolution steps involving organic chemicals.

References 

Sulfates
Praseodymium compounds